Fúlvio Miyata (born 4 May 1977) is a Brazilian judoka of Japanese origin.

References
 

1977 births
Living people
Brazilian male judoka
Brazilian people of Japanese descent